Zeynep Murat Duran (born Zeynep Murat on September 15, 1983) is a European champion Turkish female Taekwondo practitioner. She is a member of İstanbul Büyükşehir Belediyesi S.K.

Murat was born in Kayseri, Turkey. She studied physical education and sports at Erciyes University in her hometown.

At age 13, she began practising with the initiative of her father Mehmet Murat, who wanted her to become courageous. She was coached in the beginning for about one year by Arzu Tan, a former world champion.

Murat took part at the 2000 Korean Open Tournament in Chuncheon, at which she won the gold medal in the juniors category and was named "Most Technical Junior Woman Athlete". She took a gold medal at the 2000 World Cup in Lyon, France. In 2004, she became the European champion in Lillehammer, Norway. She won the silver medal at the 2005 World Taekwondo Championships in Madrid, Spain. The same year, she won another silver medal at the European Championships held in Riga, Latvia.

In 2007, Murat became again Turkish champion.

Achievements
  2000 World Cup - Lyon, France - 55 kg 
  2000 Spanish Open - Valencia, Spain - 55 kg (junior) 
  2000 European Championships - Patras, Greece - 59 kg 
  2000 Balkan Championships - Athens, Greece - 51 kg
  2000 Korea Open - Chuncheon, South Korea - 55 kg (junior)
  2000 World Juniors and Youth Championships - Killarney, Ireland - 55 kg (youth)
  2001 World Cup - Ho Chi Minh City, Vietnam - 59 kg youth
  2001 World Championships - Jeju City, South Korea - 59 kg
  2002 European Championships - Samsun, Turkey - 59 kg  
  2004 European Championships - Lillehammer, Norway - 59 kg 
  2005 German Open - Bonn, Germany - 55 kg 
  2005 World Championships - Madrid, Spain - 55 kg
  2005 Summer Universiade - Izmir, Turkey - 55 kg
  2005 European Championships - Riga, Latvia - 55 kg 
  2006 German Open - Bonn, Germany - 59 kg

References

1983 births
People from Kayseri
Erciyes University alumni
Turkish female taekwondo practitioners
Turkish female martial artists
Istanbul Büyükşehir Belediyespor athletes
Living people
Universiade medalists in taekwondo
Universiade gold medalists for Turkey
World Taekwondo Championships medalists
European Taekwondo Championships medalists
Medalists at the 2005 Summer Universiade
20th-century Turkish sportswomen
21st-century Turkish sportswomen